The Civil Liability (Contribution) Act 1978 (c 47) is an Act of the Parliament of the United Kingdom.

The Act repealed the relevant common law and made new provision for contribution between persons who are jointly or severally, or both jointly and severally, liable for the same damage and in certain other similar cases where two or more persons have paid or may be required to pay compensation for the same damage; and to amend the law relating to proceedings against persons jointly liable for the same debt or jointly or severally, or both jointly and severally, liable for the same damage.

The core principle of the Act is set out in section 1(1):
Subject to the following provisions ... any person liable in respect of any damage suffered by another person may recover contribution from any other person liable in respect of the same damage (whether jointly with him or otherwise).

The Act applies to England, Wales and Northern Ireland.

Interpretation
In  it was held that "contribution" is not limited to a contribution in respect of damages.

In Rahman v Arearose Ltd [2001] QB 351 it was held that the "same damage" meant the kind of indivisible injury as arises under common law in a case of concurrent torts.

In  the court held that the Act has extra-territorial effect, and that it would applied English contribution claims to torts that were otherwise governed by foreign laws.

External links

References

United Kingdom Acts of Parliament 1978